Pavel Yevgenyevich Sokolov (born 10 May 1976) is a former Russian professional football player.

Club career
He played in the Russian Football National League for FC Volga Ulyanovsk in 2008.

References

1976 births
Living people
Russian footballers
Association football defenders
FC Orenburg players
FC Volga Ulyanovsk players